The following is a list of largest mammals by family.

Tenrecs and allies (Afrosoricida) 
The largest of these insectivorous mammals is the giant otter shrew (Potamogale velox), native to Central Africa.

Even-toed ungulates (Artiodactyla) 

The largest species in terms of weight is the hippopotamus (Hippopotamus amphibius), native to the rivers of sub-Saharan Africa. Prehistoric hippos such as H. gorgops and H. antiquus rivaled or exceeded the modern species as the largest members of the family and order to ever exist.
The wild yak (B. mutus), reaching  in height, weighing . Pelorovis also reached 2,000 kg in weight.
The largest deer of all time was the broad-fronted moose (Cervalces latifrons). The extinct Irish elk (Megaloceros giganteus) and the stag-moose (Cervalces scotti) were of similar size to the Alaskan moose.
The largest members of the camel family are either the bactrian camel (Camelus bactrianus), which is still wild in the steppe of central Asia, or the similarly sized dromedary (Camelus dromedarius), which no longer exists as a purely wild species but is widespread in the Middle East as a domestic animal, with a large introduced feral population in Australia. Camelus moreli, also known as the "Syrian camel", may have been even larger, at an estimated shoulder height of 3.6 or even 4 m (12–13 ft).

Carnivorans (Carnivora) 

The largest carnivoran as well as the largest pinniped is the southern elephant seal (Mirounga leonina), attaining sizes up to 5,000 kg (11,000 lb) in weight and 6.9 m (23 ft) in length.
The largest living land carnivoran, on average, is the polar bear (Ursus maritimus). The Kodiak bear, a brown bear (U. arctos) subspecies, rivals the polar bear in size, but is slightly smaller. It has a similar body length with the largest confirmed wild specimen weighing . The largest bear, and possibly the largest known mammalian land carnivore of all time, was Arctotherium angustidens.
In the wilderness, the largest living member of Canidae is the gray wolf (Canis lupus).
The largest known canid is an extinct member of subfamily Borophaginae, Epicyon haydeni. The largest known specimen of this species weighed an estimated .
The largest mustelid to ever exist was likely the odd cat-like Ekorus from Africa, about the size of a modern leopard and filling a similar ecological niche before big cats came to the continent. Another contender for largest of this family is the wolverine-like Megalictis, which according to older estimates could have reached the size of a modern black bear. Newer estimates, however, significantly downgrade its size, although, at a maximum weight more than twice that of a wolverine, it is larger than most (if not all) living mustelids.

Whales (Cetacea) 
The largest whale (and largest mammal, as well as the largest animal known ever to have existed) is the blue whale, a baleen whale (Mysticeti). The longest confirmed specimen was 33.58 m (110.17 ft) in length and the heaviest was 190 tonnes.
The orca or killer whale (Orcinus orca) is the largest species of the oceanic dolphin family.
The largest of the beluga and narwhal is the beluga whale (Delphinapterus leucas).
The largest river dolphin is the Amazon river dolphin (Inia geoffrensis) from Amazon basin  , depending on subspecies. Females are typically larger than males. The largest female Amazon river dolphins can range up to 
Fragmentary fossils of extinct rorquals from the Pliocene epoch suggest they rivaled the size of the largest whales today.

Bats (Chiroptera) 

The large flying fox (Pteropus vampyrus) is generally reported as the largest bat. A few other relatively poorly known species of flying foxes may match these, but few measurements are available.

Armadillos (Cingulata) 
The extant giant of this group is the giant armadillo (Priodontes maximus), native to tropical South America.

Colugos (Dermoptera) 
Of the two colugo species in the order Dermoptera of gliding arboreal mammals in southeast Asia, the largest and most common is the Sunda flying lemur (Galeopterus variegatus).

Hedgehogs and gymnures (Erinaceomorpha) 
The largest of this order and family of prickly-skinned, small mammals is the greater moonrat (Echinosorex gymnura), native to the rainforests of the Malaysian Peninsula as well as Sumatra and Borneo. The moonrat is a member of the same family as hedgehogs, which are typically much smaller than the moonrat. Even larger was the giant gymnure Deinogalerix from Miocene Europe. It was estimated to grow larger than a modern house cat.

Hyraxes (Hyracoidea) 
Prehistorically, the hyraxes were, for a time, the primary terrestrial herbivores in Africa, and some forms grew as large as modern horses.

Rabbits, hares, and pikas (Lagomorpha) 

The largest extant wild species may be the European hare (Lepus europaeus), native to western and central Eurasia. Also, an occasional Arctic hare (L. arcticus) can also weigh as much as  but is typically smaller overall than the European and Alaskan species.

Elephant shrews (Macroscelidea) 
The elephant shrews are named for their combination of long, trunk-like snouts and long legs combined with a general shrew-like body form, but these animals are in fact not closely related to any other extant order (including tree shrews) and are a unique group behaviorally and in appearance. The largest species is the recently discovered grey-faced sengi (Rhynchocyon udzungwensis), known only from the Udzungwa Mountains of Tanzania and Kenya.

Marsupials (Marsupialia) 

The largest opossum is the Virginia opossum (Didelphis virginiana) from North America. Virginia opossums can vary considerably in size, with larger specimens found to the north of the opossum's range and smaller specimens in the tropics. They measure 13–37 inches (35–94 cm) long from their snout to the base of the tail, with the tail adding another 8.5–19 inches (21.6–47 cm). Weight for males ranges from 1.7 to 14 pounds (0.8–6.4 kg) and for females from 11 ounces to 8.2 pounds (0.3–3.7 kg).
The largest possum is the common brushtail possum (Trichosurus vulpecula) from Australia 32–58 cm with a tail length of 24–40 cm. It weighs 1.2-4.5 kg. Males are generally larger than females.
The red kangaroo (Osphanter rufus) of Australia is the largest living marsupial, and the largest member of the kangaroo family. Prehistoric kangaroos reached even larger sizes. Some species from the genus Sthenurus were similar in size as well.
Prehistorically, this suborder contained many huge marsupials, including the largest to ever exist: Diprotodon.
The Tasmanian devil (Sarcophilus harrisii), endemic to Tasmania, is the largest living marsupial carnivore. The recently extinct thylacine (Thylacinus cynocephalus), a close relative of the devil, grew larger and was the largest member of the group to survive into modern times.
Neither were closely related to the true marsupial carnivores of today. Rather, the marsupial lion was most closely related to the herbivorous koalas, while Thylacosmilus was a member of the order Sparassodonta, a group which may not have even been true marsupials.

Monotreme mammals (Monotremata) 
The largest monotreme ever was the extinct echidna species Murrayglossus hacketti, known only from a few bones found in Western Australia.

Odd-toed ungulates (Perissodactyla) 

The largest extant species is the white rhinoceros (Ceratotherium simum). The extinct Elasmotherium sibricum was the largest rhino to ever exist.
Until it was domesticated into extinction the wild horse (E. ferus) was the largest equid. The largest prehistoric horse was Equus giganteus of North America. It was estimated to grow around the same size as the aforementioned domestic horse.
The largest of the tapirs is the Malayan tapir (Acrocodia indica), the only member of the family outside of South America.
The second largest land mammal ever was Paraceratherium or Indricotherium (formerly known as the Baluchitherium), a member of this order.

Pangolins (Pholidota) 

Anteaters and sloths (Pilosa) 
The largest species is the giant anteater (Myrmecophaga tridactyla).

Primates (Primates) 

The gorillas (Gorilla gorilla & G. beringei) are the most massive living primates. The great ape Gigantopithecus, which lived in Asia between 1 million and 100,000 years ago, is the largest primate known to have existed. However this is disputed and may only have been half of that weight.
The prehistoric baboon Dinopithecus grew even larger than modern mandrills, weighing as much as a grown man.
However, even when not afflicted with gigantism, humans are the tallest living primates.

Elephants, mammoths, and mastodons (Proboscidea) 

The African bush elephant, with a largest recorded weight of 10.4 tonnes, is the largest extant member of the order Proboscidea. This would make it the largest land mammal known to ever exist, surpassing even Paraceratherium/Indricotherium.

Rodents (Rodentia) 

The largest living rodent is the capybara (Hydrochoerus hydrochaeris), native to most of the tropical and temperate parts of South America east of the Andes, always near water.
The second largest living rodent is the North American beaver (Castor canadensis), which favors water perhaps even more than its larger cousin. The largest of this family is the extinct giant beaver of North America.
The largest extinct blunt-toothed giant hutia to have weighed between 50 and 200 kg (110 and 440 lb).
The largest Muroid is the Gambian pouched rat of Africa.
The largest known rodent ever is Josephoartigasia monesi, an extinct species known only from fossils found in Uruguay. Prior to the description of J. monesi, the largest known rodent species were from the genus Phoberomys, of which two species have been discovered.

Tree shrews (Scandentia) 

Dugongs and manatees (Sirenia) 

The largest living species in the order Sirenia of dugongs and manatees is the West Indian manatee (Trichechus manatus). The largest manatees are found in the Florida subspecies.
It was a member of the dugong family.

Shrews and moles (Soricomorpha) 

Aardvark (Tubulidentata) 
The only species in this order is the unique aardvark (Orycteropus afer) of sub-Saharan Africa.

Other mammals 

An ancient relative of ungulates, Andrewsarchus, may have been the largest carnivorous land mammal ever, despite almost all living species being herbivorous. Weight estimates range anywhere from 454 to 1,816 kg (1,000 to 4,000 lb.) based on the unknown proportion of the skull's size relative to the body size.
The largest member of the extinct order Dinocerata (commonly known as Uintatheres) was Eobasileus.
The largest "creodont" was either Megistotherium or Sarkastodon. Both were among the largest predatory mammals of all time.
The largest member of the extinct Notoungulata, and the superorder Meridiungulata, was Toxodon.
Taeniolabis taoensis is the largest non-therian mammal known, at a weight possibly exceeding 100 kg.

See also 
 List of largest land carnivorans
 Largest organisms
 Largest prehistoric animals
 List of largest birds
 List of largest cats
 List of largest fish
 List of largest plants 
 List of largest reptiles
 List of largest insects
 List of heaviest land mammals
 Smallest organisms

Notes

References 

Mammals
largest